Dahlia Harris is a Jamaican actress, television and radio personality, public speaker, and film and theatre director.

Biography 
The daughter of Enid and Cyril Harris, Dahlia Harris was born and grew up with her four siblings in Spanish Town, Saint Catherine Parish in Jamaica. She started her acting career in 2005, and has appeared in many television series, and television films. She is a co-host for Television Jamaica's programme Smile Jamaica.

Filmography

References 

Date of birth missing (living people)
Living people
Jamaican actresses
Jamaican journalists
Jamaican women journalists
Year of birth missing (living people)